Cascades Shopping Centre is an enclosed shopping centre in the city centre of Portsmouth on the South Coast of England. It has a wide range of High Street retailers, and its own multi-storey car park connecting straight into the malls by lifts and stairs. Work began on the Centre in Summer 1987 and it opened on 26 September 1989.

The Centre had a £20m redevelopment of the ground and lower ground floors during 2006/2007. The food hall was converted to shopping floorspace and the open atrium above it was filled in to provide an extra 2,500 square metres of retail space and 54 additional car park spaces. The new mall was opened by the Lord Mayor of Portsmouth Councillor Mike Blake at an official ceremony on 29 May 2007.

However, the demolition of the Tricorn Centre and the delay on the redevelopment of the area by Portsmouth city council, has created a large car park immediately outside; whilst the closure of Woolworths has rendered a large retail unit that was unused for many years, Until Primark bought the unit to use to expand their store. This has made the redevelopment, with its consequent loss of smaller shops and food outlets, largely unnecessary. The redevelopment removed the food court, the iconic glass lifts and large naturally lit atrium.

Local residents are united in their agreement that the removal of the food court and the iconic glass lifts is one of the worst thought-out plans to have ever come into fruition.

Stores
The Centre has seen many stores close in recent years. The large Marks & Spencer store has been relocated to Ocean Retail Park in Copnor. The Centre has over 60 shops, including Claire's Accessories, Next, Primark, New Look Men, T.K. Maxx and many independent shops.

External links

Portsmouth City Council information sheet

Shopping centres in Hampshire
Buildings and structures in Portsmouth
Tourist attractions in Portsmouth